Al-Wata'h is a sub-district located in Hubaysh District, Ibb Governorate, Yemen. Al-Wata'h had a population of 1009 according to the 2004 census.

References 

Sub-districts in Hubaysh District